Konstantin Fyodorovich Pogreban (born 6 July 1987) is a Russian former professional football player.

Club career
He made his Russian Football National League debut for FC Dynamo Barnaul on 27 March 2008 in a game against FC Ural Yekaterinburg.

External links
 

1987 births
People from Grigoriopol District
Living people
Russian footballers
Association football midfielders
FC Dynamo Barnaul players
FC Novokuznetsk players